"Constantemente Mía" (English: "Constantly Mine") is the first single by the Italian trio Il Volo, with the Mexican singer Belinda, from their studio album Más Que Amor.

Information 
"Constantemente Mía" is a Spanish adaptation of the song "I Bring You To My Senses", which was on Il Volo's album We Are Love. The adaptation of this version was made by the compositor Edgar Cortázar, with Diane Warren and Mark Portmann. The trio's album contains two versions of the song, one with Belinda vocals and the other without it.

The song features with the participation of the Mexican singer Belinda. The song was announced for the first time on February 14, 2013, through the social networks of the artists, who want to surprise their fans with a taste of the song.

Live performance 
The Italian trio and Belinda performed the song at the Premios Oye! 2013 on May 13, 2013.

Video 
The music video was filmed in live and the premiere was on May 2, 2013, on Ritmoson Latino and Telehit.

Track listing

Charts

Release dates

References 

2013 singles
2013 songs
Spanish-language songs
Belinda Peregrín songs
Italian pop songs
Il Volo songs
Songs written by Diane Warren
Universal Music Latin Entertainment singles